The Progressive Nationalist Party of British Columbia, formerly Bloc British Columbia Party, is a minor political party in British Columbia, Canada, that was formed in 2004 to contest both provincial and federal elections on a platform of independence for British Columbia.

In the 2005 BC provincial election, the party nominated three candidates under the "Bloc British Columbia Party" banner. The party did not campaign and these candidates won a total of 276 votes (0.02% of the provincial total):
 Brian Taylor won 174 votes (0.83% of the total) in Nelson-Creston,
 A.J. van Leur won 54 votes (0.25%) in West Kootenay-Boundary, and
 Paddy Roberts won 48 votes (0.21%) in Shuswap.

British Columbia has two other minor parties that promote independence (the Western Canada Concept Party of British Columbia) or autonomy (the BC Refederation Party) for the province.

Its leader is Padraig Mac Roibeaird.

See also
 List of British Columbia political parties.

References

Provincial political parties in British Columbia
Secessionist organizations in Canada
Political parties established in 2004
2004 establishments in British Columbia